Odd Arne Brekne (born 1 September 1984) is a Norwegian sport shooter. He was born in Farsund. He qualified to compete at the 2012 Summer Olympics in London in the men's 50 m rifle prone, where he finished in 13th place.

References

External links

Norwegian male sport shooters
1984 births
Living people
People from Farsund
Shooters at the 2012 Summer Olympics
Shooters at the 2016 Summer Olympics
Olympic shooters of Norway
Shooters at the 2015 European Games
European Games competitors for Norway
ISSF rifle shooters
Sportspeople from Agder
21st-century Norwegian people